Fredy Amílcar Roncalla Fernández (Chalhuanca, Apurímac 1953) is a Quechua-language writer and artist.

Life and career
Roncalla studied at Pontifical Catholic University of Peru in Lima, and then migrated to the United States to work at Cornell University. While at Cornell, Roncalla's voice was included in NASA's Voyager Golden Record, a project chaired by professor Carl Sagan. He currently lives and writes in the New York metropolitan area where he also has established his artisan work.

Additionally, Roncalla is an executive council member of Chirapaq, Indigenous-lead organization in Peru.

Publications
 Canto de Pájaro o invocación a la palabra (Buffon Press, 1984)
 Escritos Mitimaes: hacia una poética andina postmoderna (Barro Editorial Press, 1989)
 Hawansuyo Ukun Words (Pakarina Ediciones/Hawansuyo, 2015)
 Revelación en la senda del Manzanar: Homenaje a Juan Ramírez Ruiz (Pakarina Ediciones/Hawansuyo, 2016).

References

Living people
Quechua-language poets
Quechua language activists
21st-century Peruvian poets
People from Apurímac Region
Year of birth missing (living people)